The 1991 Western Athletic Conference men's basketball tournament was held March 6–9 at the Arena-Auditorium at the University of Wyoming in Laramie, Wyoming.

BYU defeated rival Utah in the championship game, 51–49, to clinch their first WAC men's tournament championship.

The Cougars, in turn, received an automatic bid to the 1991 NCAA tournament. They were joined in the tournament by Utah, the WAC regular season champion, and New Mexico.

Format
The tournament field remained fixed at nine teams, and teams were again seeded based on regular season conference records. All teams were entered into the quarterfinal round with the exception of the two lowest-seeded teams, who played in the preliminary first round to determine who would then play against the tournament's top seed.

Bracket

References

WAC men's basketball tournament
Tournament
WAC men's basketball tournament
WAC men's basketball tournament
Sports competitions in Wyoming
Basketball in Wyoming